Nayyar Sultana (born Tayyaba Bano; 1937 – 27 October 1992), she was known as Malka-i-Jazbaat (Queen of Sentiments) and Queen of Emotions, was a Pakistani film actress. She became one of the foremost screen actresses of Lollywood in the 1950s and 1960s.

Early life 
Nayyar Sultana was born as Tayyaba Bano in Aligarh (British India) in 1937 to a Muslim family. She had her education in Women's College, Aligarh, British India. Her family migrated to Karachi, after the independence of Pakistan in 1947.

Career 
She started her movie career with Anwar Kamal Pasha's film Qatil in 1955 as a supporting actress. Her parents were related to actress Shamim Bano, wife of famous Pakistani film producer/director Anwar Kamal Pasha. Later the same year, she landed the second lead in Humayon Mirza’s Intikhab (1955). Thereafter, she started performing lead roles with the screen name Nayyar Sultana. Her notable films include Saat Lakh (1957), Baaji (1963), Mazloom (1959), Saheli (1960).

She briefly left the industry after her marriage with Darpan. She had a comeback in the late 1960s, but most of her films like Ek Musafir Ek Haseena (1968), Meri Bhabhi (1969), Hamjoli (1970) and Azmat (1973) were not very successful at the box office.

In the 1970s, she moved to performing character roles in S. Sulaiman’s Abhi To Main Jawan Hoon and two films by Hassan Tariq, Mazi Haal Mustaqbil and Seeta Maryam Margaret. These were her last critically acclaimed films before she gradually faded away from the screen. After the death of her husband Darpan in 1981, Nayyar managed his recruiting agency till her own death. She appeared in a few movies in the next decade. Nayyar Sultana had worked in over 225 films during her 37-year  movie career and received a number of awards. She was known for performing tragic roles; as otherwise known as Queen of Emotions.

Personal life 
She married  Darpan, her co-star and one of the foremost romantic hero in Pakistani film industry, at the pinnacle of her movie career and had two sons Qaisar and Ali. His elder brother Santosh Kumar was also an actor, and another brother S. Suleman was a film director.

Illness and death 
Nayyar Sultana died of cancer on 27 October 1992 at Aga Khan Hospital in Karachi, Pakistan.

Filmography

Television shows

Film

 Qatil (1955)
 Intekhab (1955)
 Saat Lakh (1957) 
 Dil mein Tu (1958)
 Mukhra (1958)
 Touheed  (1958)
 Akhri Dao (1958)
 Aadmi (1958)
 Bacha Jamoora (1959)
 Lalkar (1959)
 Mazloom (1959)
 Rahguzar (1960) 
 Behrupiya (1960)
 Aik Thi Maa (1960)
 Ayaz (1960)
 Khaibar Mail (1960)
 Daku Ki Ladki (1960)
 Saheli (1960) 
 Surayya (1961)
 Son of Ali Baba (1961)
 Bombay Wala (1961)
 Gulfarosh (1961)
 3 Phool (1961)
 Aulad (1962) 
 Mehtab (1962)
 Ghunghat (1962) 
 Barsat Mein (1962)
 Shake Hand (1962)
 Baghawat (1963) 
 Maa kay Aansoo (1963)
 Yahudi ki Ladki (1963)
 Baji (1963) 
 Dulhan (1963)
 Tangay Wala (1963)
 Aurat ek Kahani (1963)
 Devdas (1965)
 Nadir Khan (1968)
 Musafar Aik Haseena (1968)
 Saza (1969)
 Chann Sajna (1970)
 Farz Aur Mohabbat (1972)
 Jagde Rehna (1972)
 Umrao Jaan Ada (1972)
 Khuda Te Maa (1973)
 Bahisht (1974)
 Dillagi (1974)
 Pehchan (1975) 
 Sheeda Pastol (1975)
 Aik Gunnah Aur Sahi (1975)
 Chitra Tay Shera (1976)
 Badtameez (1976) 
 Kora Kaghaz (1978)
 Khushboo (1979) 
 Smuggler (1980)
 Aag Aur Sholay (1980)
 Sher Mama (1983)
 Wadda Khan (1983)
 Shaani (1989) 
 Sarkata Insaan'' (1994)

Awards and recognition

See also
 List of Pakistani actresses

References

External links
  Filmography of Nayyar Sultana on IMDb website
 

1937 births
Muhajir people
People from Aligarh
Pakistani film actresses
Nigar Award winners
20th-century Pakistani actresses
Actresses from Karachi
Aligarh Muslim University alumni
Actresses in Punjabi cinema
Actresses in Sindhi cinema
1992 deaths
Actresses in Pashto cinema
Actresses in Urdu cinema